Knowledge Malusi Nkanyezi Gigaba (born 30 August 1971) is a South African politician who served as Minister of Home Affairs of the Republic of South Africa appointed by President Cyril Ramaphosa from 27 February 2018 until his resignation on 13 November 2018. He also held the post from 25 May 2014 to 31 March 2017 as appointed by former President Jacob Zuma. He previously served as Deputy Minister of Home Affairs, Minister of Public Enterprises and Minister of Finance in the government of South Africa. He is currently a member of the National Executive Committee of the African National Congress.

He was first elected to the National Assembly of South Africa in 1999 as Member of Parliament for the African National Congress. He resigned in 2001 but was elected to the National Assembly again in 2004. President Thabo Mbeki appointed him to the position of Deputy Minister of Home Affairs. President Jacob Zuma appointed Gigaba as Minister of Public Enterprises, succeeding Barbara Hogan in October 2010. He served in that position until 2014, when he was appointed Minister of Home Affairs. Gigaba was appointed Minister of Finance in March 2017 after the controversial dismissal of Pravin Gordhan.

In February 2018, Gigaba for the second time was appointed Minister of Home Affairs in the cabinet of Cyril Ramaphosa. He served until his forced resignation in November 2018, after mounting pressure for him to resign or for Ramaphosa to dismiss him. Minister of Transport, Blade Nzimande, was serving as Acting Minister of Home Affairs. Gigaba resigned as Member of the National Assembly on 15 November 2018.

Gigaba is known as a chief architect of state capture.

Early life
Gigaba is the second born to Reverend Jabulani Gigaba and Nomthandazo Gigaba. He has three sisters and a brother. Gigaba did his primary school education at Mathonsi Primary School in Mandeni around 1983. He then proceeded to do his high school education at Vryheid State High School in 1988. He attended Ethalana high school in the district of Umzinyathi where he attained his matric. He earned a bachelor's degree in education from the University of Durban-Westville (now part of the University of KwaZulu-Natal) in 1991, and a Master's degree in Social Policy.

Early political career
During this period Gigaba became involved in various student and youth organisations such as Congress of South African Students (COSAS), the South African Youth Congress (SAYCO), the South African Student Congress (SASCO) and Young Christian Students (YCS). Some of these organisations such as COSAS and SASCO were aligned to the banned African National Congress (ANC). It was his involvement in these organisations that laid the foundation for his activities in the ANC Youth League. Gigaba has also been active in youth organizations, and was elected president of the African National Congress Youth League three times in a row (1996, 1998, 2001).

When the ANC, Pan Africanist Congress (PAC), South African Communist Party (SACP) and other liberation movements were unbanned in 1990, he joined the African National Congress Youth League, SACP and the ANC. That same year he completed his Bachelor of Pedagogics at UDW, but continued pursuing a postgraduate degree. Gigaba became one of the founding members of the Education Students Society University of Durban-Westville in 1992. The following year (1993) he was elected as chairman of SASCO at the University Durban-Westville (UDW).

Later political career
In 2004 Gigaba was re-elected to Parliament where he became Deputy Minister of Home Affairs until October 2010. He was involved in a new visa system allowing easier legal flow of migration between South Africa and Zimbabwe.

In November 2010 he became the Minister of Public Enterprises and a leading figure in the South African Government responsible for a significant aspect of the governments infrastructure investment programmes through State Owned Enterprises (SOEs) such as the embattled Transnet and Eskom.

In May 2014, former president Jacob Zuma appointed Gigaba as Minister of Home Affairs.

On 31 March 2017, Gigaba was appointed Minister of Finance, replacing Pravin Gordhan, raising suspicions that he was deployed by Zuma to assist him in developing his allegedly corrupt relationship with the Guptas.

On 27 February 2018, Gigaba was removed from his position as the Minister of Finance and replaced by Nhlanhla Nene. On the same day Gigaba was appointed as Minister of Home Affairs by President Cyril Ramaphosa following the announcement of his new cabinet, replacing Ayanda Dlodlo.

On 13 November 2018, Gigaba resigned as Minister of Home Affairs and subsequently also as Member of the National Assembly on 15 November 2018.

Controversy

Dubai Bank Account
In 2014 it was reported that State security agents had investigated a mysterious offshore bank account opened in Gigaba's name, in Dubai, when Gigaba was still public enterprises minister.

Gigaba apparently told state security agents that the account was opened by one of his officials without his knowledge. But banking and security insiders have indicated that it is difficult, if not impossible, for anyone to open an offshore account using a person's name without their knowledge, and that this could amount to fraud. His spokesperson denied any connection with the account or knowledge of the investigation.

When Gigaba appeared before The Judicial Commission of Inquiry into Allegations of State Capture at parastatals in 2018. He denied holding any bank accounts in Dubai. He stated that he only has one account with a local South African bank.

Visa Regulations
At home affairs his reputation took a blow when he implemented arduous rules for those travelling with children, creating concerns around South Africa's tourism industry.

Prior to the announcement of the visa regulations, tourist arrivals into South Africa had been steadily growing. 2011 = 2,176,719 arrivals 2012 = 2,505,763 arrivals (15,1% growth) 2013 = 2,660,631 arrivals (6,1% growth) but this changed abruptly in the third quarter of 2014 – the in-person visa application requirement came into effect in June 2014. Since then, there has been a systematic decline in tourist arrivals.

From Sep – Dec 2014, Brazil was down -37%, China -46.9% and India -14.4%, continuing into 2015. The June 2015 arrivals data from Statistics SA showed overseas arrivals down -13% . At the same time competitors were up. According to SA Tourism R7.51bn of revenue has been lost to the country.

Fireblade Aviation
In a judgment relating to the Fireblade Aviation case on 27 October 2017, the North Gauteng High Court found that Gigaba had lied under oath during his tenure as Minister of Home Affairs.  The court case related to Gibaba, then Home Affairs Minister, allegedly granting permission to the Oppenheimer family to operate a private terminal at OR Tambo International Airport in Johannesburg.

The judge called Gigaba's arguments "disingenuous, spurious and fundamentally flawed, laboured and meritless, bad in law, astonishing, palpably untrue, untenable and not sustained by objective evidence, uncreditworthy and nonsensical".

An appeal by Gigaba was heard in December 2017. Judge Tuchten concluded that "the Minister has committed a breach of the Constitution so serious that I could characterize it as a violation".

Gigaba then approached the Supreme Court of Appeal and the Constitutional Court concurrently. The Constitutional Court dismissed the application with costs, saying it was not in the interests of justice to hear the matter at that stage because the Supreme Court of Appeal had to rule on the matter first.

The Supreme Court of Appeal on 28 March 2018 dismissed Gigaba's application for leave to appeal against the judgment, saying there was no reasonable prospect of success.

Judge Malcolm Wallis said in his judgment that "there is nothing to suggest that the issues raised by the minister are of such a nature as to warrant the grant of leave to appeal notwithstanding the lack of prospects of success". The application was dismissed with costs.

Gigaba's application to the Constitutional Court for leave to appeal against a lower court ruling that he lied under oath was dismissed on 1 November 2018 "as it bears no prospects of success."

State Capture
A pivotal point in the state capture project was the appointment of Malusi Gigaba as Minister of Public Enterprises in 2010.  He exploited a loophole in the Public Finance Management Act that made it possible to use the procurement procedures of State-Owned Enterprises (SOEs) to benefit selected contractors sanctioned by the Gupta Family network, this initiated the "repurposing" of State-Owned Enterprises (SOEs) as vehicles for looting.

Gigaba is known as a chief architect of state capture, mainly because he purposely appointed key brokers of the state capture project to high level positions at State-Owned Enterprises (SOEs) Transnet and Eskom.

In 2017, Organisation Undoing Tax Abuse laid charges of treason, corruption, extortion, fraud and theft against Gigaba.

Gupta Involvement

Controversy was stirred in early 2015 when Gigaba fraudulently granted South African citizenship to members of the Gupta Family.

A Parliament portfolio committee on Home Affairs in March 2019 recommended that members of the Gupta Family be charged criminally, their South African citizenships cancelled and the information be passed to the Commission of Enquiry into State Capture.

Transnet
Gigaba was instrumental in appointing Iqbal Sharma, a known Salim Essa and Gupta Family associate, to the Transnet board and Brian Molefe, later a known Gupta Family intimate, as Transnet chief executive in 2011.

Gigaba attempted to elevate Sharma to board chair but this was shot down by his Cabinet colleagues over concerns of Sharma's known close relationship with the Gupta Family.

A new structure, formally called the Board Acquisitions and Disposals Committee, was set-up to oversee and supervise large-scale infrastructure spending and tenders worth more than R2.5bn.

Sharma became chair of this committee, enabling Gupta-linked entities to begin benefiting from Transnet tender opportunities, most notably the R51bn tender for the purchase of 1 064 locomotives.

In July 2012, Transnet issued its tender for 1,064 freight locomotives; 599 electric and the rest diesel. This included R25-billion in tenders that were signed off by Molefe and awarded to CSR (China South Rail). CSR in turn paid Tequesta Group Ltd, a Gupta-linked shell company, R5.3 billion in consultancy fees.

Transnet was a key institution for the Gupta Family and associates. Procurement processes were flouted, tenders were unlawfully awarded, contracts were signed off and extended with no accounting to the board, and money was siphoned from Transnet to Gupta-linked companies.

A National Treasury investigation concluded that Gigaba had acted outside his authority and compromised the tender process, that Transnet officials had contravened the Public Financial Management Act and misrepresented facts to the board, and called on the Hawks to launch a corruption investigation into Transnet's board members, as well as for criminal investigations into Gupta associates and businesses linked to the inflated R54 bn locomotive procurement deal.

Eskom
One of Gigaba's first moves in 2011 was to overturn a procurement decision on which the Eskom executive and board had signed off – the replacement of Koeberg Nuclear Power Station's steam generators. Soon after, Gibaba removed the board.

Most of the new appointees had no corporate or electricity sector experience. New board members included Gupta business associates: former Oakbay director Mark Pamensky, Mineral Resources Minister Mosebenzi Zwane's advisor Kuben Moodley, and Nazia Carrim, wife of a relative of close Gupta associate Salim Essa.

The governance of Eskom was captured and repurposed - the next period was the scaling up of grand corruption, with the Gupta Family managing complex brokering and money laundering.

The most notable examples include Eskom's facilitating and financing of the Guptas' acquisition of Glencore's Optimum Coal Holdings as a supplier to Eskom.

While Glencore was driven into business rescue, the Guptas' firm Tegeta benefited from an Eskom guarantee (R1.6bn), a large and unusual pre-payment (R600m) and additional lucrative coal contracts. The guarantee and pre-payment income enabled the Gupta family to buy Optimum Coal Holdings.

Further instances of Gupta-favoured coal contracts and the squeezing out of large coal miners were revealed in Parliament's inquiry report published on 28 November 2018.

The report conclusions included: 'The Committee finds that the Executive arm of government represented by the two former ministers – Gigaba and Brown – was grossly negligent in carrying out its responsibility as the sole Shareholder of Eskom. and 'recommends that the two former Public Enterprises ministers Gigaba and Brown must make presentations to the Zondo Commission in order to share insights into the roles they played as Shareholder representatives during the period of corruption and corporate capture that flourished at Eskom.

South African Airways
In 2012 Gigaba delayed support for a turnaround strategy for SAA put forward by then board chair Cheryl Carolus, causing financial damage to the airline.

After Carolus resigned, Gigaba brought back Vuyisile Kona as both acting CEO and board chair after a meeting at the Guptas' Saxonwold house with Rajesh Gupta, Duduzane Zuma, and Ace Magashule's son Tshepiso.

During 2017, South African Airways was bailed out to the tune of R5-billion, including a portion of R3-billion that was meant to settle SAA's debt with Citibank. Another R5-billion payment to SAA was due at the end of March 2018, a month after Gigaba announced VAT increase.

The reason for these costly failures in SoEs is poor corporate governance, whose seeds sprouted when Minister Gigaba was at the helm of the Department of Public Enterprises. Poor understanding of government's oversight role as a shareholder, lack of strategic perspective, and absence of a developmental mindset are other factors that undermine effective governance of SoEs.

Zondo Commission
The Zondo Commission of Inquiry into State Capture in South Africa heard evidence that implicated Malusi Gigaba  in a number of instances of alleged improper conduct. These included:
1. Interference in state-owned enterprises: Gigaba was accused of interfering in the appointment of board members and executives at state-owned enterprises, including Eskom, Transnet, and Denel. Witnesses alleged that he had used his authority to remove or appoint individuals who were aligned with his own interests or those of the Gupta family, a wealthy business family that was at the center of the state capture scandal.
2. Irregular procurement practices: The Commission heard evidence that Gigaba had approved a number of contracts and tenders without following proper due diligence or competitive bidding processes. In some cases, these contracts were awarded to companies with close ties to the Gupta family or other politically connected individuals, resulting in overpayments and other irregularities.
3. Misuse of public funds: The Commission also heard evidence that Gigaba had used public funds for personal purposes, including the purchase of luxury goods such as clothing and watches. He was also accused of using state resources to fund lavish travel expenses for himself and his family.
4. Dishonesty and perjury: During his testimony before the Commission, Gigaba was accused of lying under oath and providing misleading information. He was also accused of altering a classified report that was used in a court case involving a company owned by the Gupta family, in an attempt to protect their interests.

Overall, the Zondo Commission's findings suggested that Gigaba had acted improperly and had failed to uphold the principles of good governance and accountability. While Gigaba denied any wrongdoing, the Commission's evidence was seen as credible and compelling by many observers. The hope is that by exposing and addressing these types of alleged abuses of power, South Africa can move towards greater transparency, accountability, and integrity in its government institutions.

Personal life
He was married to Thabong Nxumalo until their divorce in 2010. He has children from his first marriage. He married Nomachule "Norma" Mngoma in 2014. Gigaba's former mistress Buhle Mkhize and his wife Nomachule "Norma" Gigaba (née Mngoma) have engaged in several spats on social media, eventually leading to confirmation of the affair.
A video of Gigaba performing a solo sexual act went viral on social media. Gigaba apologized for the incident in a series of tweets.

References

External links
Official site at the South African Ministry of Home Affairs
Zimbabwean starves outside home affairs
Sowetan deputy minister meets brother of deceased
Official site at the Parliament of South Africa

|-

|-

1971 births
African National Congress politicians
Finance ministers of South Africa
Living people
Members of the National Assembly of South Africa
Ministers of Home Affairs of South Africa
People from Eshowe
University of Durban-Westville alumni
Zulu people
Controversies in South Africa
Corruption in South Africa